Wanderson Lima da Cunha (born 9 February 1995) is a Brazilian footballer who currently plays as a defender for Jaraguá.

Career statistics

Club

Notes

References

1995 births
Living people
Brazilian footballers
Brazilian expatriate footballers
Association football defenders
Campeonato Brasileiro Série B players
Campeonato Brasileiro Série C players
Primeira Liga players
Liga Portugal 2 players
Vila Nova Futebol Clube players
C.D. Tondela players
Varzim S.C. players
Foz do Iguaçu Futebol Clube players
Goiânia Esporte Clube players
Uberlândia Esporte Clube players
Brasiliense Futebol Clube players
Esporte Clube Taubaté players
Parauapebas Futebol Clube players
Brazilian expatriate sportspeople in Portugal
Expatriate footballers in Portugal
Sportspeople from Goiânia